Glenn Noble Bassett (May 22, 1927 – August 18, 2020) was an American tennis player in the mid-20th century who later would be one of the most successful college tennis coaches of all time.

Early 
Bassett was born in Salt Lake City, Utah.  His family moved to California in 1929 and to Santa Monica, California when he was twelve.  He attended Lincoln Junior High School where he took up tennis practicing by hitting the ball against the garage door.  He became a star quickly in tournaments by the time he attended Santa Monica High School.  He would later return there as a teacher and a winning coach that led Samohi to five straight CIF team titles (1962 – 1966) which in turn led to his offer to coach at his beloved alma mater, UCLA.

Career 
Bassett was the co-captain (with Herb Flam) of the University of California at Los Angeles tennis team that won the NCAA championship 1950. Also that year, he won the singles title at the Cincinnati Masters, defeating Ham Richardson, 6–2, 4–6, 6–1, 6–1 in the final.

Bassett graduated from UCLA in 1951, and would go on to coach the UCLA tennis team for 27 seasons (from 1967 to 1993). At UCLA, he compiled a record of 592-92-2, winning 13 conference championships, seven NCAA team championships (1970, 1971, 1975, 1976, 1979, 1982 and 1984) and producing three NCAA singles champions, four NCAA doubles team champions and 49 All-Americans.

After leaving the Bruins, he became a volunteer coach at Pepperdine in 1994 and 1995 and assumed the head coaching position in 1996, leading Pepperdine to a 22–7 season.

Honors, awards, distinctions 
Bassett is the only person in NCAA history to win an NCAA tennis title as a player, assistant coach and head coach. While at UCLA, Bassett worked with some of tennis’ most recognized players, including national champions Arthur Ashe, Ian Crookenden, Billy Martin and Jimmy Connors, and 1992 Olympian Mark Knowles.

Bassett was inducted into the UCLA Athletic Hall of Fame in 1998, the ITA Collegiate Tennis Hall of Fame in 1993, the Southern California Tennis Association Hall of Fame in 2005, and the Santa Monica College Sports Hall Of Fame in 2008.

Publications 
Bassett wrote books on tennis, i.e., Tennis Today and Tennis: The Bassett System.

Death 
Bassett died on August 18, 2020 at the age of 93.

References

1927 births
2020 deaths
American male tennis players
American tennis coaches
Pepperdine Waves men's tennis coaches
UCLA Bruins men's tennis coaches
UCLA Bruins men's tennis players
Sportspeople from Salt Lake City
Tennis players from Santa Monica, California
Tennis people from California
Tennis people from Utah